Hut Gat Jahli (also Romanized as Hūt Gat  Jahlī; also known as Hūt Gat and Hūtgat-e Pā’īn) is a village in Bahu Kalat Rural District, Dashtiari District, Chabahar County, Sistan and Baluchestan Province, Iran. At the 2006 census, its population was 702, in 123 families.

References 

Populated places in Chabahar County